The 2016 IAAF World Half Marathon Championships took place on 26 March 2016 in Cardiff, United Kingdom. It was the 22nd edition of the event and the 4th in the United Kingdom alone.

In conjunction with the men's elite race, an open half marathon was held on the same course for 16,000 competitors.

Medallists

Race results
Results for the men's and women's elite races are shown below. Results for the open race are kept separately.

Men

Women

Team standings
The men's and women's team standings are shown below.

Men

Women

Medal table (unofficial)

Participation
An unofficial count yields the participation of 174 athletes from 49 countries.

 (2)
 (2)
 (4)
 (2)
 (2)
 (6)
 (4)
 (1)
 (5)
 (1)
 (1)
 (4)
 (2)
 (4)
 (10)
 (10)
 (2)
 (10)
 (1)
 (3)
 (1)
 (6)
 (1)
 (6)
 (10)
 (10)
 (2)
 (2)
 (1)
 (2)
 (1)
 (6)
 (1)
 (1)
 (8)
 (3)
 (1)
 (2)
 (1)
 (10)
 (5)
 (1)
 (1)
 (1)
 (1)
 (2)
 (9)
 (2)
 (1)

See also
 2016 in athletics (track and field)

References

World Athletics Half Marathon Championships
International athletics competitions hosted by Wales
World Half Marathon Championships
World Half Marathon Championships
IAAF World Half Marathon Championships